The 2013 Crown Royal Presents the Samuel Deeds 400 at the Brickyard, the 20th running of the event, was a NASCAR Sprint Cup Series stock car race that was held on July 28, 2013, at the Indianapolis Motor Speedway in Speedway, Indiana. Contested over 160 laps, it was the twentieth race of the 2013 NASCAR Sprint Cup Series season. Ryan Newman of Stewart-Haas Racing won the race, his first of the season, while Jimmie Johnson finished second.  Kasey Kahne, Tony Stewart, and Matt Kenseth rounded out the top five.

Report

Background
Indianapolis Motor Speedway is a four-turn rectangular-oval track that is 2.5 miles (4.023 km) long. The track's turns are banked at 9 degrees, while the front stretch, the location of the finish line, has no banking. The back stretch, opposite of the front, also has a zero degree banking. The racetrack has seats for more than 250,000 spectators.

Before the race, Jimmie Johnson was leading the Drivers' Championship with 696 points, while Clint Bowyer stood in second with 640 points. Carl Edwards followed in third with 623, one point ahead of Kevin Harvick and forty-five ahead of Dale Earnhardt Jr. in fourth and fifth. Matt Kenseth, with 576, was in sixth; tied with Kyle Busch, who was scored seventh. Eighth-placed Greg Biffle was sixteen points ahead of Brad Keselowski and twenty-two ahead of Kasey Kahne in ninth and tenth. In the Manufacturers' Championship, Chevrolet was leading with 134 points, nine points ahead of Toyota. Ford was third with 95 points.

Practice and qualifying

Two practice sessions are scheduled to be held in preparation for the race. The first session, held on July 26, 2013, was 85 minutes long, while second session was held on the following day and was 120 minutes long.

During the first practice session, Juan Pablo Montoya, for the Earnhardt Ganassi Racing team, was quickest ahead of Kurt Busch in second and Austin Dillon in third. Paul Menard was scored fourth, and Kahne managed fifth. Joey Logano, Harvick, Martin Truex Jr., Kenseth, and Earnhardt Jr. rounded out the top ten quickest drivers in the session. In the final practice session for the race, Kurt Busch was the quickest of the forty-five drivers who participated. Kahne followed in second, ahead of Montoya and Johnson in third and fourth. Marcos Ambrose, who was twenty-second quickest in second practice, managed fifth.

During qualifying, forty-five cars were entered, meaning two cars were bumped from the race because of NASCAR's qualifying procedure. After the qualifying session ended, Newman said, "I'll admit I was emotional, for me. Especially because it was the Brickyard and I hadn't won a pole here before, and I've won so many poles. It's been so long since I've won a pole people ask me if I've run out of fuel for the rockets." He was joined on the front row of the grid by Johnson. Edwards qualified third, Denny Hamlin took fourth, and Tony Stewart started fifth. Kurt Busch, Kahne, Montoya, Jeff Gordon, and Ambrose completed the first ten positions on the grid. The two drivers who failed to qualify for the race were Mike Bliss and Scott Speed.

Race

Results

Qualifying

Race results

Notes

  Points include 3 Chase for the Sprint Cup points for winning, 1 point for leading a lap, and 1 point for most laps led.
  Ineligible for driver's championship points.

Standings after the race

Drivers' Championship standings

Manufacturers' Championship standings

Note: Only the first twelve positions are included for the driver standings.

References

Brickyard 400
Brickyard 400
Brickyard 400
NASCAR races at Indianapolis Motor Speedway